Holy Trinity Church in Ingham, Norfolk, England has been designated as a Grade I listed building by Historic England. The tower dates from the 15th century.

References

Ingham
Ingham
Ingham